Palazzo della Ragione may refer to:

 Palazzo della Ragione, Padua, palace of justice building in Padua
 , a broletto (place of assembly) in Bergamo
 Palazzo della Ragione, Milan, a historic building and former judicial seat
 , on the Piazza dei Signori city square
 Basilica Palladiana, a Renaissance building in Vicenza originally known as Palazzo della Ragione

See also
 Arengario, Italian government buildings of different historic periods